Brigadier-General the Honourable Lesley James Probyn Butler, CMG, DSO (22 April 1876 – 31 December 1955) was an officer of the Irish Guards.

Biography
Butler was born on 22 April 1876, the son of the 26th Baron Dunboyne.

He was commissioned a second lieutenant in the 3rd (Militia) Battalion of the Durham Light Infantry on 1 December 1899. After the outbreak of the Second Boer War that year, a number of militia battalions were called up for active service. Butler went to South Africa, and on 28 March 1900 was transferred to a commission with a regular battalion in the regiment. For his service in the war, he was awarded the Queen's medal with four clasps. He later transferred to the Irish Guards.

He served in the First World War from 1914 to 1918, being mentioned in despatches six times and receiving the brevet rank of lieutenant-colonel, the DSO in 1916 and the CMG in 1917. He retired from the Army in 1922.

Butler was married in 1907 to Mary Christal, youngest daughter of Sir John Heathcoat-Amory, 1st Baronet; they had one son and two daughters. She died in 1951. He lived at Calverleigh Cottage, Tiverton, Devon, and was a deputy lieutenant for the county. He died on 31 December 1955.

References

1876 births
1955 deaths
Lesley
Younger sons of barons
Irish Guards officers
British Army personnel of the Second Boer War
British Army generals of World War I
Companions of the Order of St Michael and St George
Companions of the Distinguished Service Order